Richard Feist was a German luger who competed in the late 1920s. He won two medals in the men's doubles event at the European championships with a gold in 1929 and a silver in 1928.

References

German male lugers
Year of birth missing
Year of death missing